The European Marathon Cup is a quadrennial team marathon competition between European countries. Initially a stand-alone championship race inaugurated in 1981, the race has been held in conjunction with the European Athletics Championships since 1994. Individual medallists are now included in the European Championships medal table, while team medals are awarded separately from the main championships.

Each national team may enter six runner and the team score is the sum of the times of the team's three fastest finishers. The IAAF World Marathon Cup (first held in 1985) follows a similar format.

The event alternates biennially with the European Half Marathon Cup which is contested under similar rules when the European Athletics Championships are held in Olympic years

Editions

Rules
Each country can deploy a single team with a maximum of six athletes, the total time is scored on the time of the first three classified, but the other athletes of the team that finished the race will be also awarded with the medal.

Medallists

Men

Women

All-time medal table

See also
IAAF World Marathon Cup

References

External links
 Athletics Marathon European Cup - Men
 Athletics Marathon European Cup - Women

 
European Athletic Association competitions
Recurring sporting events established in 1981
Marathons in Europe